The 2004 United States presidential election in Massachusetts took place on November 2, 2004, and was part of the 2004 United States presidential election. Voters chose 12 representatives, or electors to the Electoral College, who voted for president and vice president.

Massachusetts was won by Democratic nominee and its U.S. Senator John Kerry by a 25.2% margin of victory. Kerry took 61.94% of the vote to Republican George W. Bush's 36.78%. Prior to the election, all 12 news organizations considered this a state Kerry would win, or otherwise considered as a safe blue state. Massachusetts had been a Democratic-leaning state since 1928, and a Democratic stronghold since 1960, and has kept up its intense level of the sizable Democratic margins since 1996. No Republican has won even a single county or congressional district in a presidential election since Bush's father George H. W. Bush in 1988 and no Republican won statewide since Ronald Reagan's landslide victory in 1984. In the 2004 presidential election it was also the home state of Democratic candidate John Kerry, who at the time represented Massachusetts in the U.S. Senate.

Massachusetts weighed in as about 27% more Democratic than the national average in 2004, making it the most Democratic state in the union, and the only state where Kerry won with more than 60% of the vote. As of 2022, this is the last time that the towns of Dracut, Halifax, Hanson, Millville, and Rochester voted Democratic in a presidential election.

Primaries
 2004 Massachusetts Democratic presidential primary

Campaign

Predictions
There were 12 news organizations who made state-by-state predictions of the election. Here are their last predictions before election day.

 D.C. Political Report: Solid Democrat
 Associated Press: Solid Kerry
 CNN: Kerry
 Cook Political Report: Solid Democrat
 Newsweek: Solid Kerry
 The New York Times: Solid Kerry
 Rasmussen Reports: Kerry
 Research 2000: Solid Kerry
 The Washington Post: Kerry
 Washington Times: Solid Kerry
 Zogby International: Kerry
 Washington Dispatch: Kerry

Polling
Kerry won every pre-election poll, and each with a double-digit margin and with at least 50% of the vote. The final 3 poll average showed Kerry with a strong lead of 57% to 31%.

Fundraising
Bush raised $4,060,356. Kerry raised $18,565,872, which was 10% of all the money he raised in 2004, and the third highest amount below only New York and California.

Advertising and visits
Neither campaign advertised or visited this state during the fall election.

Analysis
Massachusetts was (and is) one of the bluest states in the nation. The Bay State has voted for the Democratic presidential nominee in every election since 1960 except for Ronald Reagan's landslide victories of  1980 and 1984. In 1972, only Massachusetts and the District of Columbia voted for Democratic U.S. Senator George McGovern as Republican Richard M. Nixon won reelection.

Kerry defeated George W. Bush in Massachusetts by 25%, a similar margin to that of Al Gore in 2000. He won every county and Congressional district easily. The 2004 Democratic National Convention took place at the TD Banknorth Garden, then called FleetCenter in Boston, the state capital.

Results

By county

Results by municipality

Results by Congressional district
Kerry won all ten Congressional districts.

Electors

Technically the voters of Massachusetts cast their ballots for electors: representatives to the Electoral College. Massachusetts is allocated 12 electors because it has 10 congressional districts and 2 senators. All candidates who appear on the ballot or qualify to receive write-in votes must submit a list of 12 electors, who pledge to vote for their candidate and his or her running mate. Whoever wins the majority of votes in the state is awarded all 12 electoral votes. Their chosen electors then vote for president and vice president. Although electors are pledged to their candidate and running mate, they are not obligated to vote for them. An elector who votes for someone other than his or her candidate is known as a faithless elector.

The electors of each state and the District of Columbia met on December 13, 2004, to cast their votes for president and vice president. The Electoral College itself never meets as one body. Instead the electors from each state and the District of Columbia met in their respective capitols.

The following were the members of the Electoral College from the state. All 12 were pledged for Kerry/Edwards:
 Cathaleen L. Ashton
 Sharon M. Pollard
 Elizabeth Moroney
 Helen Covington
 Candice E. Lopes
 Susan Thomson
 Robert P. Cassidy
 William P. Dooling
 William Eddy
 Thomas V. Barbera
 Mushtaque A. Minza
 Calvin T. Brown

See also
 United States presidential elections in Massachusetts

References

Massachusetts
2004
President